CFPL is a radio station owned by Corus Entertainment and based in London, Ontario, Canada. Transmitter power is 10,000 watts daytime, 5,000 watts nighttime. Broadcast frequency is 980 AM. CFPL uses a four-tower directional antenna with differing patterns during the day and night. The station primarily airs news, and talk programming, as well as London Knights hockey and Toronto Blue Jays games. The studios are located in downtown London, while its transmitter is located south of London at Wellington Road and Scotland Drive.

History
Originally CJGC, the station first went on the air at approximately 698 kHz, at a time when wavelength was usually used rather than frequency. It later changed to 910 kHz, then, to avoid interference from a Mexican station at 909, moved to 595 kHz, which it maintained until it merged with CKOK Windsor to become CKLW in April 1933. During the 1920s and early 1930s, CJGC airtime was used from time to time by CNRL, a phantom station of the Canadian National Railways.

In September 1933, the merger was dissolved and a new transmitter at 730 kHz went on the air with the call sign CFPL. The station was an affiliate of the Canadian Radio Broadcasting Commission from 1933 to 1936 when it became an affiliate of the new Canadian Broadcasting Corporation. It was an affiliate of the CBC's Dominion Network from 1944 to 1962 before that network was integrated into CBC Radio and then remained a CBC Radio affiliate for several years. The station changed frequency in 1941 to 1570 kHz, and in February 1949 it changed to 980 kHz. Like many other stations, it had to reduce transmitter power during the night.

The CBC affiliation continued until 1978, when CBC established CBCL-FM on 93.5 MHz, a rebroadcast transmitter of CBL in Toronto. The station played MOR and adult contemporary into the late 1990s (and featured Top 40 music in some dayparts during the 1960s), but has since transitioned to 100% news/talk/sports.

On November 27, 2017, CFPL rebranded as Global News Radio 980 AM.

References

External links
 Global News Radio 980 CFPL
 
 

Fpl
Fpl
Fpl
Radio stations established in 1922
1922 establishments in Ontario
FPL
CNR Radio
Canadian Radio Broadcasting Commission